Yang Jung-a (born July 25, 1971) is a South Korean actress. Aside from starring in television dramas such as Here Comes Ajumma (2006) and He Who Can't Marry (2009), Yang gained popularity when she appeared in Gold Miss Is Coming, a matchmaking show for eligible female celebrities.

Filmography

Television series

Film

Variety/Radio show

Awards and nominations

References

External links 

 
 Yang Jung-a at SH Entertainment 
 
 
 
 

1971 births
Living people
South Korean television actresses
South Korean film actresses
L&Holdings artists